The Enemy Within is a 1994 American political thriller television film directed by Jonathan Darby and written by Darryl Ponicsan and Ronald Bass. It is a remake of the 1964 film Seven Days in May, itself based on a 1962 novel, and stars Forest Whitaker, Jason Robards, Jr., Dana Delany and Sam Waterston.  The film involves a planned military coup to overthrow the President of the United States. The television film remake was originally announced in 1984, while producer Peter Douglas worked for his father's film production company The Bryna Company (which had produced Seven Days in May). The film took ten years to develop and was finally produced in 1994 through Peter Douglas' own film production company, Vincent Pictures. It aired on HBO on August 20, 1994.

Plot summary
U.S. Marine Colonel Lyle MacArthur "Mac" Casey discovers an apparent plan by Chairman of the Joint Chiefs of Staff General R. Pendleton Lloyd and Secretary of Defense Charles Potter to remove President William Foster from office and replace him with Vice President Walter Kelly, who they feel would be more willing to do their bidding. 

Casey and Foster desperately seek evidence before the coup occurs. They encounter a setback when Attorney General Arthur Daniels (who has told Potter about his misgivings about the constitutionality of the plan) is murdered. Casey contacts long time acquaintance Betsy Corcoran, who is Foster's Chief of Staff, and is able to secretly bring his concerns to Foster. 

With only a few days left until the coup, Casey receives unexpected support from "Jake", a Russian operative able to supply the kind of satellite and photographic proof that Foster cannot risk requesting of anyone in the compromised US intelligence community. When Jake provides access to Sarah McCann, secretary to the murdered Potter and secretly a Russian agent, Lloyd's operatives assassinate her. 

When all else fails, with troops deployed in 12 major cities and Lloyd and Potter in the Oval Office demanding Foster's resignation, Casey advises that he will confess to being part of their conspiracy (having uncovered enough information to sound legitimate in his so-called confession), denying the true conspirators any chance of claiming that they have acted within the Constitution. 

Lloyd resigns, and Foster tells Potter that he and that other conspirators will simply resign in stages over the coming year, in order to prevent knowledge of, and a panic regarding, their treasonous acts.

Cast

References

External links

1994 television films
1994 films
1994 thriller films
1990s English-language films
1990s political thriller films
American political thriller films
American thriller television films
Films about coups d'état
Films about the United States Marine Corps
Films based on adaptations
Films based on American thriller novels
Films scored by Joe Delia
Films with screenplays by Ronald Bass
HBO Films films
Political film remakes
Remakes of American films
Thriller film remakes
Television films based on books
Television remakes of films
1990s American films